Firetail is a common name for several bird species:

 Red-browed firetail, Neochmia temporalis, or red-browed finch 
 Red-faced firetail, Neochmia ruficauda, star finch
 Beautiful firetail, Stagonopleura bella
 Diamond firetail, Stagonopleura guttata
 Red-eared firetail or Western firetail, Stagonopleura oculata

Finches
Birds by common name